Carlotta Nobile (Rome, 20 December 1988 – Benevento, 16 July 2013) was an Italian art historian, violinist, writer, blogger, and artistic director of Santa Sophia Academy chamber orchestra in Benevento from September 2010 up to her death. A multi-facetted personality of artist and scholar, among the most popular young Italian violinists of her time, she is also known for her testimony of courage in the fight against cancer and for the deep experience of Faith gained in the last months of her life, which ended at the age of 24. In February 2018 she was included among the "Young Witnesses" of the Synod of Bishops 2018 on the theme "Young people, faith and vocational discernment", announced by Pope Francis. She is a probable candidate for canonization.

Career
Born into an ancient family, she graduated in violin at the Conservatory of Benevento when she was only 17, attaining First Class Honours with Distinction, under the guide of her mentor Massimo Bacci. After that, in her short but intense career, she took many specialist courses in violin like the one with Pierre Amoyal at the Mozarteum University of Salzburg, with Pavel Vernikov at the International Academy of Portogruaro and at the Fiesole School of Music, and with Eugen Sârbu at London.

Absolute winner of many national competitions, including the First Absolute Prize at the "F. Kreisler" National Violin Competition of Matera (2006) and at the "Città di Viterbo" National Competition (2008), and the First Prize at the Riviera della Versilia National Competition (2005), she took the award of "Distinguished Musician" at the International Ibla Grand Prize 2007 and "Ernest Bloch Special Mention" at the International Ibla Grand Prize 2008.

Marcello Abbado said about her: «an exceptional musician, a sweet and sensitive girl with an extraordinary vocation for music». Martin Berkofsky, with whom Nobile played in duo, will declare: "Our concert was the greatest and most wonderful musical experience I had in seventy years of life."

She combined music with her passion for arts, taking a bachelor's degree cum laude in Art History Studies at Sapienza University of Rome in 2010 and attending the University of Cambridge (Art History International Summer Courses in 2009), the Contemporary Art Course at Sotheby's Institute of Art of New York (in 2010) and taking the LUISS Master of Art 2011/2012 in Rome.

In December 2008, she released her first book "Il silenzio delle parole nascoste" ("the silence of hidden words"), followed by "Oxymoron", published by Aracne Editrice in 2012. For several years she wrote a music column called "Righe Sonore" on the website Quaderno.it and wrote for the magazine "Realtà Sannita".

At only 21, in 2010, she became the artistic director of Santa Sophia Academy Chamber Orchestra in Benevento. As first Artistic Director, she is committed to the Academy launch, also for the purpose of exporting it outside its region, taking care of the three-year concert program, new formula on the whole national territory. Her proposal for a varied and eclectic program, ranging from Mozart to The Beatles, from Piazzolla to Strauss, from Bach to the Italian Twentieth century and the Neapolitan Eighteenth century, collects acclaim and public success. Nobile will remain active as Artistic Director of Santa Sophia until the untimely death. Her work helped to lay the foundations for the rapid entry of the academy into the Fund for the Performing Arts (FUS) of the Italian Ministry of Cultural Heritage. After her death, the Academy will live three years of stop. It then resumed its activities under the artistic direction of Maestro Filippo Zigante.

During her career, she explored the interconnections among music, contemporary art and writing, using interdisciplinarity and contamination criteria.

In Rome, together with some other young scholars, she founded the group "Almost Curators", with the aim of connecting contemporary art experts with general public. As a member of the "Almost Curators" group, she managed cultural events and wrote many articles on the group's blog.

Cancer and the blog

In October 2011, when she was 22, Nobile was diagnosed with melanoma; she fronted every possible cure and various surgical interventions<ref name="AboutMe">About me Il Cancro E Poi ilcancroepoi.com</ref> while keeping on her musical and artistic career, alternating concerts and hospitals recoveries. On the newspaper La Stampa, Sandro Cappelletto said: “The more the treatment was hard and the diagnosis got worse, the more her music became a form of rebellion to her destiny, her real life, never losing a bit of quality”.

In April 2012, she started, under a concealed identity, her Facebook page "Il Cancro E Poi" ("Cancer and Afterwards") that gave birth to a huge community of people suffering from cancer just like her. They identified themselves with her thoughts, finding a vital help in her words.Carlotta Nobile, goodbye to the angel of violin www.Tgcom24 In August she created the related website.

During the period of her illness, playing in a duo with the pianist Martin Berkofsky, she joined "Donatori di Musica" ("donors of music"), a social community involved in bringing music concerts in the Italian cancer wards.In memory of Carlotta Nobile playing with the pianist Berkofsky archiviostorico.corriere.it About her social and charity commitment there's the book "Donatori di musica" by L. Fumagalli, Curci Editions (2015).

 Faith, the pope, and death 

 Faith 
In the last months of her life, Carlotta lived a deep faith experience,Carlotta Nobile, the girl who wanted to meet Pope Francis – San Giacomo in Augusta Church website sangiacomoroma.blogspot.itSearch results for Carlotta Nobile on the website of San Giacomo in Augusta Church sangiacomoroma.blogspot.it born suddenly on 4 March 2013 at her awakening from a crisis that brought her to the Hospital of Milan for a few days. This fact, perceived like a revelation, was anonymously told by Carlotta on her blog dedicated to cancer in the last post before her death:

She continued in the same post:

Letter to Pope Francis 
Her spirituality was considerably inspired by Pope Francis's sermon calling young people to bear the cross with joy (24 March 2013 Homily).

On Good Friday 2013, in the centre of Rome, Nobile was looking for a church because she wanted to confess, but usually they are closed during the lunch break. The only one left open was the San Giacomo in Augusta church, in Via del Corso. There Nobile met the parish priest don Giuseppe Trappolini, they had a very touching conversation and, as Don Giuseppe said, she "cried from joy" as she talked about her story, her battle against melanoma and the tranquillity she felt after listening to the words of Pope Francis. The priest was moved by a remarkable coincidence: just the day before he was received with some other Roman priests by the Pope and in that occasion the Holy Father asked them to keep the churches open on Good Friday all day long to allow anybody to confess. Trappolini decided to tell the pope the story of Nobile in a letter and on April 10 morning, the pope rang up back to tell he would pray for her, adding: "This girl gives me courage". Just in the moments of the phone call, Nobile was seized by a cerebral crisis in the Hospital of Carrara, where she had gone as a volunteer musician of the "Music Donors". On waking up in the ward, on the morning of 11 April 2013, after having recovered lucidity, still in bed and in the company of his mother, she reported that she was having a trinitarian vision consisting of a luminous triangle on the chamber wall.

Nobile wrote the pope a letter to communicate her faith in life and in this  divine encounter."Don Giuseppe Trappolini, parroco romano, è stato ospite a pranzo di Papa Francesco", intervista di Tv2000 a Don Giuseppe Trappolini www.youtube.com

That letter reads in part:

 The last three months 
Thanks to Don Trappolini, Nobile was about to meet personally the pope, but in May 2013 her condition started to get worse and so she went back to Benevento and she spent the last months of her life in her family house. In those months she dedicated herself to prayers in a mood of total trust, self-abandon, and gratitude with God."Si può diventare santi in pochi mesi? Storia di Carlotta che ha abbracciato la Croce con gioia", video-intervista di Aleteia a Don Giuseppe Trappolini www.youtube.com  On the last night of her life, that between 14 and 15 July 2013, Nobiles father reportedly was awakened by the following words of Nobile, whispered repeatedly in a serene tone and with gaze turned towards the ceiling:

The next day, a few hours before her death, she gave her loved ones the last farewell:

After two years of struggle, she died at the age of 24.
The death of the Violin Angel – as the media and the web called her – was announced on the most renowned newspapers and national TV channels.Carlotta Nobile: La donna dell'Oltre., Corto-documentario di 8 min. (2016) sulla vita di Carlotta Nobile. www.youtube.com

Testimony of faith

Her funerals were held in the morning of 17 July 2013 in the Basilica church of San Bartolomeo, so full to not contain all the people coming. After having read some fragments and personal messages through which Carlotta announced calmly the "healing" of her soul, the Rector of the Church Mgr Mario De Santis preached in his homily: «Young people, move, walk and find yourselves! She found the Faith. Today it’s not a sad day, on the contrary the bells will ring in a festive way because even if we cry for having lost a person, on the other side this event offers us the meaning of Resurrection».

A few months later, on Carlotta's birthday, she will be publicly remembered by the Archbishop of Benevento Andrea Mugione as "an extraordinary example of Faith and love ending with sacrifice".

Her story of Faith, told for the first time and translated in different languages in 2016 by the catholic information site Aleteia, has spread on the web, on television and on the Catholic press in Italy, United States, France, Slovenia, Croatia, Spain, Mexico, Portugal, Brazil, India and Vietnam.

 The Synod of Youth and the voice of the bishops 
In February 2018 she was included among the "young witnesses" of the Synod of Bishops 2018 on the theme "Young people, faith and vocational discernment", called by Pope Francis. Various Bishops and theologians have publicly expressed themselves on her figure.

The theologian Father François-Marie Léthel O.C.D., one of the leading experts in the theology of saints, Consultor of the Congregation of the Causes of Saints and Preacher of the spiritual exercises to the Holy Father Benedict XVI and to the Roman Curia in 2011, wrote about her: "Yes, Jesus was really "the greatest love" of Carlotta in the sufferings of the last months. (...) Together with her, we too thank Jesus for the gift of his infinite love and we learn to joyfully carry the cross. With her witness on earth and now with her intercession in heaven, Carlotta will help us to walk towards holiness."Thus Msgr. Andrea Mugione, Archbishop Emeritus of Benevento: "Jesus returns to the Father, but the ascending Jesus carries with him the gift of his wounds, of his wounds. (...) And He tells us that this is the price of forgiveness that He gives us. The price that Carlotta also paid by joining Christ. With prayer, joining the wounds of Jesus, she brought with him - it is true - she brought her wounds with her as a gift to the Father. (...) This is why I say that with Carlotta, with the last few months of her life, where she lived strong moments of faith and surrender to the Lord ... with Carlotta we can carry forward what is the evangelization of Suffering, to help us re-read the experience of Suffering in the light of the mystery of Love and pain of Christ, who saved us not from the Cross but in the Cross. (...) In the Cross, she, Carlotta, certainly understood what the Faith is worth - and lived it deeply - how much Love is worth, how much the Joy of living is worth - and she had so much of Joy of life -. For this we can really call her ... in her suffering she has become a Witness of the Faith."

The Archbishop of Taranto Msgr. Filippo Santoro said of her: "A life so full of intensity, of various interests, music, song, culture, literature ... (...) but her success is accomplished in that day of the experience of March 4, 2013 in which there is the perception that life is realized when one gives, life is realized when it is opened to others, it opens up to the mystery of love (...). And therefore we stammer before these testimonies, which show us that the Cross and the Resurrection go together, that the Cross is the path to follow. (...) At a time when at the end, the last words - "Lord, I thank you. Lord, I thank you. Lord, I thank you."- they open wide on an extraordinary hope. This is a thing of holiness. It could not be explained without the presence of Christ. "Msgr. Francesco Zerrillo, Bishop Emeritus of Lucera-Troia, expressed himself in this way, commenting on the last months of the life of Carlotta: "The last was the time of ascents. (...) I saw the sacredness of life. I saw the gift of life. (...) Thus Carlotta's life has become a life-gift, a life offered to God. She was truly a prodigy. (...) I would like to stimulate everyone to a deeper knowledge of this girl, who was really brave. She was a seed of hope that offers a positive message, offers help to those who are discouraged in life and offers everyone the vision of a "beyond". (...) That "beyond" of Carlotta is a vision that is no longer earthly, but is heavenly, no longer human, but divine. "

Archbishop Michele Seccia, Archbishop of Lecce, recounts this: "A person who leaves us a special witness in life. Her memory so alive to you today becomes a watermark, a litmus paper through which the Word of God we have heard becomes even more understandable. (...) She has sown in his life so well in taking care of cancer patients, of terminal people. (...) The Gospel is current! If today our friend Nobile reminds us that a sudden listening to an inner light, a dream, a word of the Gospel, a rediscovered certainty is enough, the safe way of death is the way of Life! A logical absurdity, but it is the way of Salvation, of Hope. (...) And we really want to thank God for giving us the opportunity to reflect on this in the light of a concrete experience. "

So instead Msgr. Gennaro Pascarella, Bishop of Pozzuoli: "And I am certain that this evening Carlotta is with us. When we say the Creed we say "I believe the communion of saints", that is, I believe that among us the Church here on this Earth and our brothers who have preceded us there is this communion, this exchange also of prayers. I am sure that she also played her part this evening from Heaven. Y She has truly experienced an ordeal, she has experienced human frailty to the full, which takes the body and consumes it. She tells us «even in our frailties Jesus is there. He is present». Indeed, while I listened to you I felt strongly once again that even in what is the greatest fragility, death, even there God came down, Jesus is there and gives us hope. Here, I now want to invite you to say that prayer so dear to Carlotta, the Our Father, which must be the prayer of every disciple of Jesus. "

Recognitions
In September 2013, she posthumously received the ANLAI Prize,The Anlai prize www.anlailiuteria.it and the Arechi II Prize from the Province of Benevento in June 2014.Arechi II and Gladiatore d'oro Prize Award www.provincia.benevento.it

The Sapienza University of Rome awarded her a posthumous MA degree in Art History StudiesCorriere Roma: breaking news roma.corriere.it and, with solemnity, on 22 November 2014, dedicated to her memory the hall Aula Tre of the History of Art and Performance Arts Department "for her fine studies on the relationships among Art, Music and Writings".

Thanks to the will of Donatori di Musica group, the music hall of the cancer ward of San Maurizio Hospital in Bolzano has borne her name from 6 August 2014.Tg Alto Adige news of July, 8th 2014 (from the 17th minute) www.rai.tvTg Alto Adige news of July, 8th 2014 (from the 12th minute) www.altoadigetv.it

On 20 September 2016 the Benevento city Council disclosed that the nursery school in via Firenze has been named after Carlotta Nobile, because of her "extraordinary example of Faith, love and life". With the participation of the highest authorities of the city, the ceremony of entitlement was held on 20 December 2016, on Carlotta's birthday. In that occasion the mayor Clemente Mastella said: «The entitlement of the nursery school to Carlotta Nobile is for all of us a very important event. Carlotta is a positive example of the spirit of resilience Pope Francis always talks about: in fact she fronted the adversities with a deep strength and courage. Her example is to be followed by the entire community».Ntr24 | Benevento, l'asilo nido di via Firenze intitolato alla musicista Carlotta Nobile www.ntr24.tv

On 4 March 2017, during the inauguration of the academic year, the "Nicola Sala" State Conservatory of Music of Benevento names a Classroom of the institute after Carlotta Nobile, in the presence of the Minister of Education, Universities and Research of the Italian Republic Valeria Fedeli and of the highest civil, military and religious authorities of the city.

On 31 October 2013 American pianist Martin Berkofsky (with whom Carlotta shared the dedication to Donatori di Musica'') in one of his last performances before his death, wanted to commemorate Carlotta with a concert held in Milan at the Società del Giardino, playing the religious piano compositions written by Franz Liszt.

References

External links
 Carlotta Nobile's Official Website
 "Cancer and Afterwards", Carlotta Nobile's blog on cancer

Italian art historians
Italian women historians
Italian classical violinists
Italian women writers
Italian writers
Italian bloggers
Italian women bloggers
21st-century venerated Christians
1988 births
2013 deaths
Deaths from cancer in Campania
Deaths from melanoma
21st-century classical violinists
Women classical violinists